NNP may refer to:
Net National Product
New Nationalist Party, a far-right British political party
New National Party of Grenada
New National Party (Netherlands), a far-right Dutch political party
New National Party (South Africa)
New Nationalist Party (Fiji)
Nairobi National Park
Nuzzler Network Protocol